Marty Haugen (born December 30, 1950) is an American composer of liturgical music.

Biography
Marty Haugen was born December 30, 1950, in Wanamingo, Minnesota. He was raised in the American Lutheran Church (ALC) in Minnesota, and became a member the United Church of Christ. He writes contemporary hymns and liturgical music for the Lutheran church. Haugen holds a B.A. degree in psychology from Luther College and an M.A. degree in pastoral studies from the University of St. Thomas in St. Paul, Minnesota. Haugen pursues a career as a liturgical composer and workshop presenter.

The majority of his compositions are published by GIA Publications. His works include two settings of the liturgy for Lutheran use, "Holden Evening Prayer" and "Now the Feast and Celebration", and settings of the Catholic Mass, including the "Mass of Creation". He has also composed other works, including liturgical settings, choral arrangements, sacred songs, and hymns, including "Gather Us In", "Eye Has Not Seen", "Canticle of the Sun", "We Are Many Parts", "We Remember", "Awake! Awake, and Greet the New Morn", and "Shepherd Me, O God", as well as psalm settings and paraphrases.

Haugen is a performing musician, and has recorded a number of CDs.  He holds a position as composer-in-residence at Mayflower Community Congregational Church (UCC) in Minneapolis.

Lutheran liturgical music
Haugen has written liturgical settings for the ELCA, including Now the Feast and Celebration, (written in collaboration with then campus pastors at Pacific Lutheran University Susan Briehl, Dan Erlander and Martin Wells), Unfailing Light, an evening communion service written in collaboration with Pastor Susan Briehl, Holy Communion Setting Two for Evangelical Lutheran Worship (ELW), and an evening prayer setting, Holden Evening Prayer, originally written for Holden Village.

These settings have been published in various forms, with some of them appearing in the ELCA hymnal supplement With One Voice and the newest hymnal, Evangelical Lutheran Worship (2006).

Selected discography 
 We Come Dancing (1999) (with Donna Peña, Gary Daigle and Bobby Fischer)
 In The Days To Come-Songs Of Peace  (2007)
 That You May Have Life (2005)
 The Feast Of Life  (2000)

Appears on 
 Liam Lawton, Clouds' Veil

See also 
 Contemporary Catholic music
 St. Louis Jesuits
 Dan Schutte

External links 
Marty Haugen personal website

 Worship Times  (Resource Publications) 
Evangelical Lutheran Worship
Living Liturgy

1950 births
American male composers
American people of Norwegian descent
American Protestants
Composers of Christian music
Contemporary Catholic liturgical music
Living people
Luther College (Iowa) alumni
People from Goodhue County, Minnesota